Osówek may refer to the following places:
Osówek, Lublin Voivodeship (east Poland)
Osówek, Bytów County in Pomeranian Voivodeship (north Poland)
Osówek, Starogard County in Pomeranian Voivodeship (north Poland)